Noegus is a genus of jumping spiders that was first described by Eugène Louis Simon in 1900.

Species
 it contains twenty-four species, found in Central America, Guyana, Argentina, Brazil, Peru, and French Guiana:
Noegus actinosus Simon, 1900 – Brazil, Peru
Noegus arator Simon, 1900 – Brazil
Noegus australis (Mello-Leitão, 1941) – Brazil
Noegus bidens Simon, 1900 – Brazil, Argentina
Noegus coccineus Simon, 1900 – Brazil
Noegus comatulus Simon, 1900 – Brazil, Argentina
Noegus difficilis (Soares & Camargo, 1948) – Brazil
Noegus franganilloi (Caporiacco, 1947) – Guyana, French Guiana
Noegus fulvocristatus Simon, 1900 – Brazil
Noegus fuscimanus Simon, 1900 – Brazil
Noegus fuscomanus (Taczanowski, 1878) – Peru
Noegus lodovicoi Ruiz & Brescovit, 2008 – Guyana
Noegus mantovani Bauab & Soares, 1978 – Brazil
Noegus niger (Caporiacco, 1947) – Guyana
Noegus niveogularis Simon, 1900 – Brazil
Noegus niveomarginatus Simon, 1900 – Brazil, French Guiana
Noegus pallidus (Mello-Leitão, 1947) – Brazil
Noegus petrusewiczi Caporiacco, 1947 – Guyana
Noegus rufus Simon, 1900 – Peru, Brazil
Noegus spiralifer (F. O. Pickard-Cambridge, 1901) – Guatemala, Panama
Noegus transversalis Simon, 1900 – Brazil, French Guiana
Noegus trilineatus (Mello-Leitão, 1940) – Brazil, Guyana
Noegus uncatus Simon, 1900 – Brazil
Noegus vulpio Simon, 1900 (type) – Brazil, Guyana

References

External links
 Photographs of Noegus species from Brazil

Salticidae genera
Salticidae
Spiders of Central America
Spiders of South America